"Made You Look" is the first single from Nas' 2002 album, God's Son. Built around several samples lifted from the Incredible Bongo Band's "Apache", the single was important in establishing Nas' direction following his battle with Jay-Z and the Stillmatic album in its reliance on intricate lyricism and an old-school aesthetic. The song reached much commercial success, on the level of "I Can", and it was a sizeable hit among urban audiences and remains one of the more popular tracks on the God's Son album. It is his third highest charting single to date.

Lyrically "Made You Look" is similar to much of the material Nas was releasing in the early 2000s (decade) with its loose, complex, free-associative rhymes conveying obscure, wide-ranging themes: partying, boasting, hyping Nas and his legacy.

The beat for "Made You Look" was also used on the song "In My Bed" by British singer Amy Winehouse. Both songs were produced by Salaam Remi.

The official remix features new additional verses by Jadakiss and Ludacris.

Use in media
This song has been featured in the 2009 video game Skate 2, after being featured in Paul Rodriguez's part in Girl "Yeah Right", along with "Get Down". It was also featured in the 2015 video game NBA 2K16 and the 2021 video game NBA 2K22. The song was used in promotions for the Netflix show "Luke Cage". Also, this is the theme song to the podcast "Upon Further Review with Brian Brennan". It was featured during the credits of the 2018 Netflix movie "Game Over, Man!"

Acclaim
In 2005 Blender ranked "Made You Look" as the 175th best song from the 1980s through the 2000s (decade). They also named it the 16th best single of 2003.
Pitchfork Media ranked it as the 47th best single of 2002.
Q ranked it as the 903rd best song ever in 2003.

Track listing

A-side
 "Made You Look" (Explicit Version) (3:22)
 "Made You Look" (Instrumental with Guns) (3:14)

B-side
 "The Cross" (Explicit Version) (3:47)
Produced by Eminem
 "The Cross" (Instrumental) (3:47)

Charts

Weekly charts

Year-end charts

References

External links
 Music video on YouTube

2002 singles
Columbia Records singles
Music videos directed by Benny Boom
Nas songs
Songs written by Nas
Songs written by Salaam Remi
Song recordings produced by Salaam Remi